Irina Petrovna Zarubina (April 22, 1907 – May 20, 1976) was a Soviet and Russian actress. People's Artist of the RSFSR (1951).

Biography 
She was born on April 22, 1907, in Kazan.

In 1929, she graduated from the Russian State Institute of Performing Arts, after which she worked at the Leningrad Theater of the Proletcult.

Since 1935 – a member of the Leningrad Comedy Theater.

She died on May 20, 1976. She was buried at Komarovsky cemetery in Saint Petersburg.

Filmography
 The Storm (1933) – Varvara Kabanova
 House of Greed (1933) – Yevpraksiya
 Girl Friends (1936) – Natasha
 Friends (1938) – Vera
 Peter the Great (1938) – Afrosinya
 Gorky 2: My Apprenticeship (1939) – Natalya
 Vasilisa the Beautiful (1940) – Malanya Savvichna
 Valery Chkalov (1941) – Actress
 Two Friends (1954) – Olga Nikolayevna, teacher
 A Crazy Day (1956) – Zoya Valentinovna Dudkina
 Different Fortunes (1956) – Stepan Ogurtsov's aunt
 The Captain's Daughter (1958) – Vasilisa Yegorovna
 Alyonka (1961) – Vasilisa Petrovna
 The First Trolleybus (1963) – Trolleybus passenger
 Three Fat Men (1966) – Accompanist
 Village Detective (1969) – Praskovya Pankova, milkmaid

External links
 
 
 
 Irina Zarubina

1907 births
1976 deaths
20th-century Russian actresses
Actors from Kazan
Communist Party of the Soviet Union members
Honored Artists of the RSFSR
People's Artists of Tajikistan
People's Artists of the RSFSR
Recipients of the Order of the Red Banner of Labour
Russian film actresses
Russian stage actresses
Soviet film actresses
Soviet stage actresses